Mark Peach is a former American football coach.  He was the second head football coach at Campbellsville University, serving from 2003 to 2004 and compiling a record of 15–7.

Head coaching record

College

References

Year of birth missing (living people)
Living people
Campbellsville Tigers football coaches
High school football coaches in Kentucky